Flinch was a Vertigo Comics horror anthology.

It ran 16 issues from June 1999 until January 2001 and featured the talents of Jim Lee, Bill Willingham, Frank Quitely, Joe R. Lansdale, and many others. Rumours of cancellation seemed to plague the book throughout its run.

Timothy Truman said of the series: "...the best art I've done in any single comics story is on the "Brer Hoodoo" short story I did with Joe for Vertigo's Flinch anthology".

Issue guide

Awards
Issue #11 won a Horror Writers' Association Bram Stoker Award for "Red Romance" by Joe R. Lansdale.
Issue #11 also received a  nomination for a 2001 Will Eisner Comic Industry award for best cover artist (Phil Hale).

Notes

References

1999 comics debuts
2001 comics endings
Comics anthologies
Horror comics
Vertigo Comics titles